Alusine Fofanah is a Sierra Leonean politician and diplomat. A member of the Sierra Leone People's Party, Fofanah was the Minister of Foreign Affairs and International Cooperation from 1995–1996 and a member of Sierra Leone's Parliament for many years. He is also a lecturer in the graduate school for social sciences at Njala University.

References

Year of birth missing (living people)
Living people
Sierra Leone People's Party politicians
Government ministers of Sierra Leone
Academic staff of Njala University
Sierra Leonean diplomats
Foreign Ministers of Sierra Leone